The Al Farooq Omar Bin Al Khattab Mosque is a mosque located in Dubai, United Arab Emirates. The mosque is named after Umar bin Al Khattab, a companion of the Prophet Mohammed who became the second Caliph after Abu Bakr and was given the title Al Farooq, meaning someone who distinguished truth from falsehood. The original Al Farooq Omar Bin Al Khattab Mosque was established on the same site in 1986.

The building was renovated twice, in 2003 and later in 2011 by the order of Khalaf Ahmad Al Habtoor, the chairman of the business empire that bears his family name and whose interests stretch from vehicle sales, schools and hotels to engineering and publishing. It was opened to the public on July 29, 2011.

The Al Farooq Omar Bin Al Khattab Mosque can accommodate 2,000 worshipers and is considered one of the UAE’s largest mosques and the third of its kind to open its doors to non-Muslims after the Mosque of late Sheikh Zayed Bin Sultan Al Nahyan in Abu Dhabi and the Grand Mosque in Jumeirah.

The Al Farooq Omar Bin Al Khattab Mosque & Centre has welcomed Islamic religious figure Sheikh Ahmad Ali Al Nahas, Muazin of Haram Al Maki.

Design
The inscriptions in the mosque are Ottoman inscriptions inspired by the Blue Mosque in Istanbul and had an Andalusian touch. Andalusian art is an Islamic school, dating back to the year 711 when the Moors first landed in the South of Spain. Its influence is obvious throughout both the exterior and the interior – from the colourful tiles in the front entrance, which surround a traditional-style fountain, to the shapes used in the interior design. These inscriptions were sculpted by hand by 60 Moroccan craftsmen from the city of Fez, the stronghold of this authentic Andalusian heritage.

The interior of the mosque has many features. The carpets were specially manufactured in Germany; a new method of air conditioning was adopted. The main dome rises to approximately 30 metres in height. There are also 15 smaller domes with four additional half domes surrounding the main one.

Al Farooq Mosque
Total area of 93,400 square feet
Area of the mosque complex spans 8,700 metres. The mosque itself is 4,200 square metres 
Capable of accommodating 2,000 worshipers
Library holds a collection of 4000 Islamic and other religious titles
Youth club
Lecture Hall
Classroom
Administration
Housing for Imam and Mu’azin

Architecture
The external architecture is based on the Sultan Ahmed Mosque in Istanbul, known as the Blue Mosque for the thousands of Iznek tiles that colour its interior walls and arches. 
21 domes and 124 stained glass windows
Four pencil-shaped minarets rise high, measuring 65 meters each 
60 expert artists and craftsmen from Morocco decorated the interior
Red and gold colored carpet was commissioned in Germany
The mosque was modeled using plaster of Paris and fusaifisa tiles, originating from Fez, Morocco

References

External links 
Gulf News
Dubai Biggest Mosque
In Pictures
Al Farooq Mosque during Eid
The National- Al Farooq Omar Bin Al Khattab Mosque

2011 establishments in the United Arab Emirates
Mosques in Dubai
Mosques completed in 2011